Cornelis George Boeree (January 15, 1952 – January 5, 2021) was an American psychologist and professor emeritus at Shippensburg University, specializing in personality theory and the history of psychology.

Life
Boeree was born in Badhoevedorp, near Amsterdam, in the Netherlands. He moved with his parents and brother to the United States in 1956 and grew up on Long Island, New York. He married Judy Kovarik in 1972 and had three daughters. He received his doctoral degree in 1980 from Oklahoma State University. He died on January 5, 2021, at his home in Shippensburg, Pennsylvania.

Works on psychology
Boeree was the author of the first online psychology texts, which he made available at no cost to students and other interested parties starting in 1997. They have been translated into German, Spanish, and Bulgarian. Two of his textbooks have been published, one on personality theories and one on the history of psychology.

Lingua Franca Nova
Boeree was also the inventor of the auxiliary language Lingua Franca Nova, which first appeared in 1998 on the Internet. He was the coeditor of the Lingua Franca Nova dictionary.

References

External links 

1952 births
2021 deaths
21st-century American psychologists
Constructed language creators
Dutch emigrants to the United States
Oklahoma State University alumni
Pennsylvania State University alumni
People from Haarlemmermeer
People from Long Island
Shippensburg University of Pennsylvania faculty
Speakers of international auxiliary languages